Shailaja Pujari (born 12 June 1982) is a former Indian weightlifter.

Pujari competed at the 2002 Commonwealth Games where she won gold medals in the 75 kg snatch, 75 kg clean and jerk and 75 kg total events.

She was removed from India's 2006 Commonwealth Games team after testing positive for steroids and was given a lifetime ban from competing in January 2010 after testing positive for a banned substance in September 2009.

References

1982 births
Living people
Indian female weightlifters
Weightlifters at the 2002 Commonwealth Games
Commonwealth Games gold medallists for India
Commonwealth Games medallists in weightlifting
Sportspeople banned for life
Indian sportspeople in doping cases
Doping cases in weightlifting
20th-century Indian women
21st-century Indian women
Medallists at the 2002 Commonwealth Games